Emmanuel L. Fernandez (born August 27, 1974) is a Canadian former professional ice hockey goaltender who played in the National Hockey League with the Dallas Stars, Minnesota Wild and the Boston Bruins. Fernandez was born in Etobicoke, Ontario, but grew up in Kirkland, Quebec.

Playing career
Fernandez was drafted in the third round, 52nd overall, of the 1992 NHL Entry Draft by the Quebec Nordiques. Before playing in the NHL, he was traded to the Dallas Stars in 1994 for Tommy Sjödin and a third round pick, which ended up being Chris Drury.

In June 2000, Fernandez was traded with Brad Lukowich to the Minnesota Wild for two draft picks, a third-round pick in 2000 and a fourth-round pick in 2002.

During the 2002–03 NHL season, Fernandez shared netminding duties with Dwayne Roloson as the Wild made their first ever appearance in the post-season, defeating the Colorado Avalanche in the first round and the Vancouver Canucks in the second before falling to the Mighty Ducks of Anaheim in the NHL Western Conference final.

During the 2004–05 NHL lockout, Fernandez played for Luleå HF of the Elitserien in Sweden.

In his earlier years, Fernandez was often criticized for having confidence and discipline issues and being inconsistent. In a 2006 interview, Fernandez credited his improvement to gaining maturity, becoming the Wild's number one goaltender after the departure of Dwayne Roloson, and a switch to the butterfly style of goaltending.

On June 30, 2007, Fernandez was traded to the Boston Bruins for forward Petr Kalus and a fourth-round draft pick in 2009. An injury plagued 2007–08 NHL season saw Fernandez play in only four games for the Bruins, recording a 2-2 record. However, during the 2008-09 NHL season, Fernandez and fellow Bruins goalie Tim Thomas formed a goaltending duo which earned them the William M. Jennings Trophy as the goaltenders playing for the team with the fewest allowed goals, 196. Fernandez recorded a 16-8-3 record with a 2.59 goals against average.

Fernandez's contract with Boston expired after the 2009 season. With the Bruins preferring to proceed with Thomas and Tuukka Rask as their goaltenders, Fernandez became a free agent, but unsigned by any other team, retired from active play, although he made no formal retirement announcement.

Personal life
Fernandez is the nephew of former Montreal Canadiens, New Jersey Devils and Minnesota Wild head coach and Hall of Famer Jacques Lemaire, whom Fernandez played for from 2001 to 2007.

Career statistics

Regular season and playoffs

International

See also
 Notable families in the NHL

References

External links

1974 births
Living people
Boston Bruins players
Canadian ice hockey goaltenders
Canadian people of Portuguese descent
Dallas Stars players
Ice hockey people from Quebec
Kalamazoo Wings (1974–2000) players
Laval Titan players
Luleå HF players
Minnesota Wild players
People from Kirkland, Quebec
Sportspeople from Etobicoke
Ice hockey people from Toronto
Quebec Nordiques draft picks
William M. Jennings Trophy winners
Canadian expatriate ice hockey players in Sweden